Canonicus (ACM-12) was a Camanche-class auxiliary minelayer in the United States Navy. It was named for Canonicus, a chief of the Narragansett Indians.

Canonicus was originally delivered to the United States Army Coast Artillery Corps, Mine Planter Service in 1942 by Marietta Manufacturing Company of Point Pleasant, West Virginia. The ship was named USAMP Major General Erasmus Weaver for Erasmus M. Weaver, Jr., the first chief of the National Guard Bureau.

After serving in the Mine Planter Service of the U.S. Army Coast Artillery Corps, it was transferred to the Navy in 1944, classified ACM-12. ACM-12 was reclassified MMA-12, 7 February 1955 and assigned the name Canonicus on 1 May 1955. Canonicus was never commissioned and thus never bore the "United States Ship" (USS) prefix showing status  as a commissioned ship of the U.S. Navy.

After being in reserve with the Navy the ship became a yacht, was converted to diesel, and became the Sandy Hook pilot boat New Jersey.

References

External links
 Canonicus (MMA 12) ex-ACM-12 (NavSource Online)
 Coast Artillery Corps – Army Mine Planter Service

 

Ships built in Point Pleasant, West Virginia
1942 ships
Mine planters of the United States Army
Camanche-class minelayers
World War II mine warfare vessels of the United States